The Men's 62 kg event at the 2010 South American Games was held over March 26 at 16:00.

Medalists

Results

References
Final

62kg M